"Louisiette" is a song recorded by Canadian country music group Prairie Oyster. It was released in 1994 as the second single from their fourth studio album, Only One Moon. It peaked at number 4 on the RPM Country Tracks chart in October 1994.

Chart performance

Year-end charts

References

1994 singles
Prairie Oyster songs
Arista Nashville singles
1994 songs
Arista Records singles
Songs written by Keith Glass